Meysam Ilanlou is an Iranian professional futsal player. He is currently a member of Mes Sarcheshmeh in the Iran Futsal's 1st Division.

Honours

Club 
 Iranian Futsal Super League
 Champion (1): 2013–14 (Dabiri)
 Runners-up (1): 2012–13 (Saba)

References 

1989 births
Living people
People from Qom
Iranian men's futsal players
Almas Shahr Qom FSC players
Dabiri FSC players
Shahid Mansouri FSC players
Ana Sanat FC players
Farsh Ara FSC players
Arjan Shiraz FSC players
Melli Haffari FSC players
21st-century Iranian people